Astrothelium palaeoexostemmatis is a species of corticolous (bark-dwelling) lichen in the family Trypetheliaceae. Found in northern Thailand, it was formally described as a new species in 2019 by lichenologists André Aptroot and Harrie Sipman. It has roughly spherical ascomata, measuring 0.4–0.6 mm in diameter; they are covered by the thallus with only a black ostiole (pore) visible. The ascospores are hyaline  and muriform (i.e., divided into multiple chambers by vertical and transverse septa) and measure 85–100 by 20–24 μm. The specific epithet palaeoexostemmatis refers to both its Palaeotropical distribution and its resemblance to Astrothelium exostemmatis, a neotropical species.

References

palaeoexostemmatis
Lichen species
Lichens described in 2019
Lichens of Thailand
Taxa named by André Aptroot
Taxa named by Harrie Sipman